Zuzana Králová (born 1985) is a Czech fashion designer born in Tábor, Czechoslovakia. After achieving a Master of Arts at Jan Evangelista Purkyně University in Ústí nad Labem in the Czech Republic and a Diploma in Fashion Design at Istituto Europeo di Design in Madrid, she set up her own fashion brand named Kralova Design in 2009. She was a finalist at Brilliance Fashion Talent 2010, under a jury composed of prominent designers and fashion professionals in the Czech Republic and Slovakia. She was also selected as a finalist to the National Design Award of the Czech Republic, an award open to all facets of design.
 
In 2012 she was a finalist in the TOP STYL Designer Prize in the Czech Republic.
In 2013 she received the Special Jury Prize at the Contest of New Designers of the Comunidad de Madrid.

References

External links 
 http://www.kralovadesign.com/

Czech fashion designers
Living people
1985 births
Czech women fashion designers
People from Tábor